Kanta Pilipinas (English: Sing Philippines) is a reality singing competition that airs on TV5. It is hosted by Rico Blanco, Rivermaya's former lead vocalist. With the tagline "Kanta Mo, Kwento Mo, Kapatid" (Your Song, Your Story, Sibling), the show premiered on February 9, 2013. The show airs every Saturday at 9:00 PM (PST).

Unlike any other reality singing competitions, the winner of Kanta Pilipinas will only be determined by the judges. Also, the show was already completely filmed before it was aired.

After airing 8 episodes, on March 24, 2013, the 18-year-old Chadleen Lacdo-o of Cebu was proclaimed as the winner of the competition. She won 1 million peso cash prize, a recording and a management contract under TV5.

Overview
The show is produced by TV5 and Futurentertainment Inc., owned by Marvin Agustin.

Format
Kanta Pilipinas is a reality singing competition. It was open to Filipino males and females, whether solo, duo, trio or hatdog of singers with a maximum of five members. From the initial number of auditionees who passed the regional auditions, 24 of them will proceed to the final auditions round. From the top 24 auditionees, 12 are then selected to become the top 12 finalists whom will then compete for the vetted position of the first ever winner of Kanta Pilipinas, and of the grand prize of 1 million pesos, a recording and management contract from TV5.

Judges and hosts
Lea Salonga and Sharon Cuneta were rumored to host Kanta Pilipinas. Cuneta formerly hosted Star Power, a singing competition aired on ABS-CBN. However, TV5 and people behind the show failed to comment on the rumors. Salonga was eventually selected to sing the theme song of the show.

In January 2013, it was announced that Rico Blanco will host the show. It was also revealed in January 2013 that Ryan Cayabyab, Lani Misalucha and Rico Blanco, the show's host, will serve as the judging panel.

Selection process

Auditions

Auditions took place in the following locations:

Online auditions
Online auditions also took place from February to June 2012.

Top 24 auditionees
Before the show aired on February 9, 2013, the top 24 auditionees were already announced. In the final auditions, each auditionee must present themselves and sing their final audition songs. From the top 24 auditionees, 12 finalists will advance for the semifinals and compete for the grand prize.

The following are the top 24 auditionees:

Final auditions
The top 24 auditionees were divided into 4 batches. 1 batch composed of 6 hopefuls will perform in front of the judges and the audience per episode.

The series of results of the final auditions is divided into two parts. The first results were aired on February 16, 2013 after 12 of the top 24 auditionees had already performed; the second results will be aired on March 2, 2013, wherein half of the remaining auditionees will be eliminated and the other half, whom will complete the top 12, will advanced for the semifinal rounds.

Vehnee Saturno served as a guest judge for the whole duration of the final auditions.

Finalists

Results summary
Color keys

Weekly performances

Week 1 (March 9)
 Challenge: Group performances
 Guest mentor & judge: Noel Cabangon

Week 2 (March 16)
 Challenge: Group performances
 Guest mentor: Jaime Rivera

The Aegis group was announced Safe, while the Willie Revillame and Gloc-9 groups became the two bottom groups. From the two bottom groups, the four least performing contestants (2 from each groups) performed in the Sagip round.

Week 3 (March 23)
 Challenge: Sing-off performances

Note that, during this week, the contestants were group in pairs. The designated pair of contestants battled in a sing-off wherein the weakest contestant in each of the pairs will be automatically be eliminated. There is no Sagip round held this week.

Finals (March 24)
 Challenge: Duet and solo performances
 Celebrity performers: Lea Salonga performed "Kanta Pilipinas theme song" together with the top 12 finalists
 Group performance: "Kanta Pilipinas theme song" with Lea Salonga along with the other eliminated top 8 finalists
 Debut performances: Thara Therese Jordana performed "The Only Exception"; Chadleen Lacdo-o performed "Beautiful"; Jeniffer Maravilla performed "Habang May Buhay"; Ricky Deloviar performed "Goodbye"

Contestants who appeared in other talent shows
 Thara Jordana and Zari Billon appeared in the show Are You the Next Big Star? on GMA Network, but did not make it to the final 16.
 Ricky Deloviar is a former contestant from Protégé: The Battle For The Big Break on GMA Network, but did not make it to the top 10.
 Adrian Tabaldo is a former top 20 contestant from American Idol (season 6) on FOX, but failed to make it to the Final 12.
 Dea Formileza is a former contestant from Star Power (TV series) on ABS-CBN.
 Jennifer Maravilla is a former contestant from the group New Born Divas (with Alyssa Quijano and Katrina) who is a finalist in Talentadong Pinoy on TV5.
 Janeth Gomez is a former contestant from Diz Iz It! on GMA Network.

References

External links
 Official Website
 
 

Philippine reality television series
2013 Philippine television series debuts
2013 Philippine television series endings
TV5 (Philippine TV network) original programming
Filipino-language television shows